Eucalyptus largeana, commonly known as the Craven grey box, is a species of medium-sized to tall tree that is endemic to a restricted area of New South Wales. It has rough, fibrous or flaky bark on the trunk and larger branches, smooth greyish bark above, lance-shaped adult leaves, flower buds in groups of seven, white flowers and cup-shaped or barrel-shaped fruit.

Description
It has rough, fibrous or flaky bark on the trunk, sometimes on the larger branches, smooth white or grey bark above.

Taxonomy and naming
Eucalyptus largeana was first formally described in 1934 by William Blakely from a specimen collected by Wilfred Alexander de Beuzeville and Richard Large in the "Avon State Forest, Craven". The description was published in Blakely's book, A Key to the Eucalypts. The specific epithet (largeana) honours Richard Large.

Distribution and habitat
Craven grey box grows on slopes and ridges in wet forest on the near-coastal ranges of New South Wales between the Hunter River and the headwaters of the Macleay and Manning Rivers.

References

largeana
Myrtales of Australia
Flora of New South Wales
Trees of Australia
Plants described in 1934
Taxa named by William Blakely